Leow is a surname. The surname originated from mainland China but descendants can be found across East Asia, most notably; Singapore & Malaysia.

Origin of surname:
 
The First Emperor (皇帝) granted Miao (缪)and Yan (颜) as surnames. During King Yin Zhou’s (殷纣王) reign, ruthlessness and cruelty, forced people with the two surnames to live in seclusion and subsequently, they changed their surname to Liao (廖).

In the light of the above: There are more concrete evidence that leans towards the Liao (廖) surname originating from the descendants of Liao Shu An (廖叔安).
Historical records noted that Liao Shu An (廖叔安) controlled floods with great achievement during Xia Dynasty (夏朝). He received Country honours, was conferred and founded Liao State (蓼国). The ancient Liao State (蓼国) was situated in an area called Liao Mountain (蓼山), where dazzling and brilliant Liao flower (蓼花) grew in abundance. Thus, the State was named after the flower Liao (“蓼”, “飂”, “翏”, “廖” which all sound the same). Today, Liao State (蓼国) is located in a town called Hu Yang Town (湖阳镇), 40 km south in Tang He County (唐河县), Henan Province (河南省). Liao Mountain (蓼山) is a 385.9 meters high hill below it has two man-made rivers, Liao Yang He and Liao Yin He (蓼阳河及蓼阴河); and a Liao lake (蓼湖) around it. There lies a relic of an ancient protective wall halfway up the hill, that was built to protect the State during war. Unfortunately, Chu state (楚国) was increasingly gaining power and strength which eventually wiped out Liao State (蓼国) during the war.

The clan association now operates in Singapore under the Nanyang Leow-Sih Association banner.

Notable people with the surname include:

 Julian Leow Beng Kim (born 1964), Malaysian prelate of the Catholic Church
 June Leow (born 1964), Malaysian politician
 Jeremiah Leow (born 1999), Singaporean entrepreneur
 Willy Leow (1887–1937), German communist politician and activist
 Philip Leow (born 1996), Guyanese businessman and closer